Larinia elegans is an orb-weaving spider species found from Austria to China.

See also 
 List of Araneidae species: G-M

References

External links 

Araneidae
Spiders of Europe
Spiders of Asia
Spiders described in 1939